Events in the year 1941 in Turkey.

Parliament
 6th Parliament of Turkey

Incumbents
President – İsmet İnönü 
Prime Minister – Refik Saydam

Ruling party and the main opposition
  Ruling party – Republican People's Party (CHP)

Cabinet
12th government of Turkey

Events
18 January: Petrol Ofisi a national petroleum company founded.
24 March: Turco Soviet declaration. Soviet Union promised neutrality in case of an assault on Turkey.
18 June: German-Turkish Friendship and Nonaggression Pact signed.
22 June: Turkey declared neutrality in the recently started Germany-USSR War.
23 June: Refah tragedy, a Turkish ship was torpedoed by an anonymous battle ship, causing 168 deaths.
10 December: 1941 Van–Erciş earthquake
19 December: Due to war time hardships, bread consumption was restricted in Istanbul.

Births
15 may – Özdemir Sabancı, industrialist
24 June – Erkin Koray, musician
18 July – Bedrettin Dalan, Mayor of İstanbul
26 August – Ayşe Kulin, writer
13 September – Ahmet Necdet Sezer, president (2000–2007)
21 November – İdil Biret, pianist
26 December – Şener Şen, actor

Deaths
25 April – Salih Bozok (born in 1881), Atatürk's aide de camp
3 July – Kâzım Dirik (born in 1881), retired general
17 July – Meliha Ulaş (born in 1901), politician, teacher
7 October – Cemal Mersinli (born in 1875), retired general

Gallery

References

 
Years of the 20th century in Turkey
Turkey
Turkey
Turkey